Larapinta is the  Arrernte  (Aboriginal language) name for the Finke River in Australia  

It may also refer to the following places in Australia:

Larapinta, Northern Territory, a suburb 
Larapinta Trail, a walking track in the Northern Territory
Larapinta, Queensland, a suburb